Khatoco Khánh Hoà was a Vietnamese football club based in Nha Trang, Khánh Hòa. They played in the top division in Vietnamese football, V.League 1, before being rebranded as Khanh Hoa FC in 2012. Their home stadium is Nha Trang Stadium.

Notable players
 Lê Tấn Tài
 Đặng Đạo
 Võ Văn Hạnh
 Đào Văn Phong

Achievements

National competitions
League
V.League 2:
 Winners: 2005
Second League:
 Winners: 2004

Other competitions
KTV Cup:
 Winners  2005

Managers
 Alfred Riedl
 Nguyen Ngoc Hao (2006)
 Le Huu Tuong (Nov 2006 – Feb 2007)
 Hoàng Anh Tuấn (Jan 2007–2012)

External links
Official site

Association football clubs established in 1976
Association football clubs disestablished in 2012
Football clubs in Vietnam
1976 establishments in Vietnam
2012 disestablishments in Vietnam